Panayiotis (Takis) Biniaris (Athens, 9 June 1955) is a Greek singer who represented his country in the Eurovision Song Contest 1985, in which he sang Miazoume. He earned 15 points and finished in 16th place. Biniaris also participated in the Greek national selection for Eurovision in 1991 with the song Opou ke na’ssai which was unplaced.

References

1955 births
Living people
20th-century Greek male singers
Eurovision Song Contest entrants of 1985
Eurovision Song Contest entrants for Greece
Greek pop singers
Singers from Athens